Ismaïl Benyamina (born June 2, 1983) in Tlemcen, Algeria, is an Algerian football player who is currently playing for USM Alger in the Algerian league.

1983 births
Living people
Algerian footballers
USM Alger players
WA Tlemcen players
Association football forwards
21st-century Algerian people